Iatt may refer to:

Iatt, Louisiana, a community in the United States
Lake Iatt, a lake in Louisiana
International Association for Technology Trade (IATT). a business consortium